Suji High School is a public high school (ages 16–18) in Yongin, South Korea. It was opened on November 1, 1994. It holds 684 students as of 2010. It used to be an unstandardized high school where only students who achieve a high grade in middle school were allowed to enter. However, since 2015, it became standardized due to Yongin's standardized high school policy.

Symbols
School tree: pine - It means unyieldingly noble beliefs and principles and loyalty.
School flower: magnolia - Because of its color, it means noble and pure mind.
School bird: crane- It stands for lofty grace.
School emblem: Its shape come from its Hangul name 수지's ㅅ and ㅈ and its color means harmony of sky(blue) and land(yellow). Also it stands for high(lofty) spirit and modesty.

History

1994. 11. 01 Official permission of school foundation.

1995. 03. 01 Appointment of 1st principal, ChoongGyo Shin.

1995. 03. 04 Entrance ceremony of freshmen(10 classes, 461 persons).

1997. 02. 14 1st Graduation ceremony(21 persons).

1998. 09. 01 Appointment of 2nd principal, JongChoon Lee.

1999. 02. 25 Completion of Food service center.

2000. 07. 03 Opening of multipurpose classroom.

2000. 10. 27 Briefing session of Reading Education Research School appointed by Education Ministry.

2001. 11. 20 Briefing session of Volunteer Activity Demonstration School appointed by Gyeonggi-do Education Authority.

2002. 11. 21 Briefing session of Volunteer Activity Demonstration School appointed by Gyeonggi-do Education Authority.

2003. 09. 01 Appointment of 3rd principal, ShinSup Park.

2004. 09. 01 Appointment of 4th principal, DoSup Shin.

2005. 06. 24 Extension of back building.

2005. 08. 31 Foundation of Parents Boram Corps of teachers.

2005. 10. 20 Briefing session of Education Curriculum Research School appointed by Gyeonggi-do Education Authority.

2005. 12. 30 Completion of elevator for challenged person.

2007. 01. 30 Library remodeling.

2009. 02. 10 Kim Sung-Woo finished the whole course of high school.

2010. 02. 05 Completion of Math and Science subject-classroom.

2010. 03. 01 Appointment of 5th principal, JeongYeol Lyu.

Curriculum
Grade 10th
General subject: Korean, Ethics, Society, Korean History, Mathematics, Science, Technique&Housekeeping, P.E, Music, Art, English.
Special subject:
Grade 11th
General subject: Information society and Computer, P.E and Health, Chinese character.
Advanced (Intensified) subject: Literature, MathematicsI(1st term), Mathematics II (2nd term), Physics I, Chemistry I, Biology I, Earth Science I, English I.
Elective subject: Music and Life/ Art and Life
Grade 12th
General subject: Citizen ethics, Ecology and Environment.
Advanced (Intensified) subject: Reading, Practical English Conversation, Integral and Statistics, Geometry and Vector.
Elective subject: Spanish/Chinese, Korean Geography/Korean Modern and Contemporary History, Physics II/Chemistry II/Biology II/Earth Science II (select 2), English Reading and Composition/English II.

Student Council
It consists of chairman, vice-chairman, scribe, 8 department heads, 8 deputy department heads.
Chairman
Vice-chairman
Scribe
General affairs department
Department head
Deputy department head
Order-Fulfilling department
Department head
Deputy department head
Environment department
Department head
Deputy department head
Service department
Department head
Deputy department head
Health department
Department head
Deputy department head
Art and Science department
Department head
Deputy department head
Information department
Department head
Deputy department head
P.E department
Department head
Deputy department head

Location

It is located in 113, Supung-ro, Suji-gu, Yongin-si, Gyeonggi-do, South Korea

Related Article
 http://news.donga.com/3//20091019/23525398/1
 http://news.naver.com/main/read.nhn?mode=LSD&mid=sec&sid1=102&oid=032&aid=0000039531
 http://biz.heraldm.com/common/Detail.jsp?newsMLId=20100701000413
 http://www.doopedia.co.kr/doopedia/master/master.do?_method=view&MAS_IDX=101013000864331

References

External links
 

High schools in South Korea
Educational institutions established in 1994
1994 establishments in South Korea

ko:수지고등학교